Sandra Rosario (born 17 April 1971) is a Puerto Rican softball player. She competed in the women's tournament at the 1996 Summer Olympics.

References

1971 births
Living people
Puerto Rican softball players
Olympic softball players of Puerto Rico
Softball players at the 1996 Summer Olympics
Place of birth missing (living people)